Noah Donovan Sahsah (born 8 July 2005) is a Danish professional footballer who plays for Copenhagen.

Club career 
Having been part of Copenhagen youth system since he was six years old, Noah Sahsah made his professional debut for the FCK first team on 17 March 2022. He replaced Roony Bardghji at the 75th minute of the return Conference League round of 16 game against PSV Eindhoven, a home loss that would see the club eliminated from the competition.

International career 
Born in Denmark, Sahsah is of Moroccan descent. He is a youth international with Denmark, taking part in the Euro U17 with his selection in 2022.

References

External links

2005 births
Living people
Footballers from Copenhagen
Danish men's footballers
Denmark youth international footballers
Danish people of Moroccan descent
Association football midfielders
F.C. Copenhagen players